The Central District of Baneh County is a district (bakhsh) in Baneh County, Kurdistan Province, Iran. At the 2006 census, its population was 78,016, in 17,522 families.  The District has one city: Baneh.  The District has one rural district (dehestan): Shuy Rural District.

References 

Baneh County
Districts of Kurdistan Province